This is a list of Russian curling federations and clubs.

Federations

Clubs and teams 

(sources:)

References

External links
 Russian Curling Federation 
 Curling in Russia  (news, events etc.)
 Russian Curling League (RCL)  (union of amateur curling teams & clubs)
 RCL in Facebook 
 RCL in Instagram

See also 
 List of curling clubs

External links
 Curling organizations in Russia 

Curling in Russia
Curling clubs in Russia
Russia
Curling